Her Bridal Nightmare is a 1920 American silent comedy film from the Christie Film Company. It was one of Colleen Moore's first comedy films. The film still exists and has been released on DVD.

Story
Mary, a bride-to-be, has a troublesome wedding day. A jealous suitor steals the groom's tuxedo and hires a pickpocket to strike the wedding and reception. The pickpocket, a master of disguise but a dope as well, wears the tuxedo to the reception and steals all the gifts. The groom is arrested in his skivvies and thrown in jail. The suitor tells Mary that the groom has left her for another woman. Mary decides to commit suicide, but is unsuccessful on her own. She runs into the pickpocket and pays him to kill her when she least suspects it. In the meantime, the groom has managed to be released from jail and sent back by the suitor. When Mary learns her groom has not been unfaithful, she decides she wants to live, but as her hired killer is in disguise, she must wear a disguise herself (a man's suit). The pickpocket's girlfriend has found religion and converts the pickpocket, who returns to the reception with his booty, confesses, and saves the day.

Cast
 Eddie Barry as unnamed
 Gino Corrado as unnamed
 Helen Darling as unnamed
 Colleen Moore as Mary
 Earle Rodney as Jack

References

Bibliography
Jeff Codori (2012), Colleen Moore; A Biography of the Silent Film Star, McFarland Publishing, (Print , EBook ).

External links

1920 films
Films directed by Al Christie
Silent American comedy films
American silent feature films
1920 comedy films
American black-and-white films
1920s American films